Lu Ying-chi (born 6 April 1985 in Pingtung County, Taiwan)  is a weightlifter from Taiwan.

At the 2006 World Weightlifting Championships she ranked 8th in the 63 kg category with a total of 215 kg.

She won the silver medal in the 63 kg category at the 2008 Summer Olympics, with 231 kg in total.

Notes and references

External links
  at beijing2008 
 picture at 2008 Summer Olympics

1985 births
Living people
Olympic bronze medalists for Taiwan
Olympic weightlifters of Taiwan
Weightlifters at the 2008 Summer Olympics
People from Pingtung County
Olympic medalists in weightlifting
Weightlifters at the 2006 Asian Games
Medalists at the 2008 Summer Olympics
Taiwanese female weightlifters
Asian Games competitors for Chinese Taipei
21st-century Taiwanese women